Goko Mako is a 2019 Tamil language romantic comedy independent film directed by Arunkanth. The film stars Ramkumar, Danusha, Chaams & Kalangal Dinesh in the lead roles with Sara George, Vinod Varma, YG Mahendra and Santhana Bharathi in supporting roles. This is the first Tamil theatrical feature film to be completely shot on a Go Pro.

Cast 
Ramkumar as Puyal
Danusha as Nila
Sara George
 Chaams as Pluto
Kalangal Dinesh
 Y. G. Mahendra as Natchatrian
 Delhi Ganesh as  Delhi Ganesh
 Santhana Bharathi as Yamagundan
 Ajay Rathnam as Ajay Rathnam
Vinod Varma as Vinod Varma

Production 
The film was shot in 12 days under a low budget and completely shot on a GoPro. The title of the film is based on Coimbatore colloquial language. Arunkanth V in addition to being the director, was also the producer and music composer. Debutant Ramkumar, nephew of actor Sarathkumar., plays the male lead while Dhanusha plays the female lead. Sara George, who starred in Taramani and Chaams were signed on to play pivotal roles. During the making of the film, the dialogues were not practiced, but were improvised upon filming.

Release 
A website was created for pre-release sales to enable the film to run at a low price in multiple multiplexes. The film released on 14 February 2019. A reviewer from Maalai Malar gave the film a mixed review, while film portal ChennaiVision stated the film "gives us a feeling of watching a funny collage of YouTube and TikTok videos."

References

External links 
 

2019 films
2019 romantic comedy-drama films
Indian romantic comedy-drama films
2010s Tamil-language films